Stefano Ranucci (born 1963, Rome, Italy) is an Italian manager and  president of the Università degli Studi Niccolò Cusano .

Biography
Ranucci is president of the Università degli Studi Niccolò Cusano. From 2010 is part of the political party Italian Union Movement - MUI. He was general manager of Iberia airline (Italy and Malta), Vastours (Corte Ingles) and Ristonova srl.

See also
Fondazione Niccolò Cusano

References

Academic staff of the Università degli Studi Niccolò Cusano
1963 births
Living people
Businesspeople from Rome